George White (born November 17, 1977 in Detroit, Michigan) is a former Canadian Football League linebacker.

High school
White attended North Royalton High School in North Royalton, Ohio, where he was a standout in football, basketball, and track and field. In senior football, he won All-State honors, was a Blue Chip All-American, and was selected to play in the Big 33 Classic.

College career
White attended Boston College, where he was a star in both football and track and field. In football, he was a four-year letterman and finished his career with four sacks and 273 tackles. In track and field, he was the champion in the outdoor long jump.

Further reading 

1977 births
Boston College Eagles football players
Calgary Stampeders players
Canadian football linebackers
Living people
Players of American football from Detroit
Saskatchewan Roughriders players
Canadian Football League Rookie of the Year Award winners